Russell P. Hughes (born December 23, 1946)  an American/British chemist, is the Frank R. Mori Professor Emeritus and Research Professor in the  Department of Chemistry at Dartmouth College. His research interests are in organometallic chemistry, with emphasis on the chemistry of transition metal complexes interacting with fluorocarbons. His research group’s work in this area led to several creative syntheses of complexes of transition metal and perfluorinated hydrocarbon fragments.

Education 
Hughes was born on December 23, 1946 in Denbigh, Wales, the son of Elliot and Joan (Profit) Hughes. He became interested in Chemistry at Ecclesfield Grammar School, near Sheffield, under the tutelage of inspiring teacher Stanley Spencer. He earned his B.Sc. at the University of Manchester Institute of Science and Technology, and his Ph.D. at the University of Toronto  under John Powell.  He held postdoctoral fellowships at the University of Bristol in Michael Green's laboratory and at McGill University with John Harrod.

Research career 
Hughes began his independent scientific career as an assistant professor at Dartmouth College in 1976.  He was promoted to Associate Professor in 1982, and Professor in 1986.  He chaired the department of Chemistry from 1991–1994. In 1999, he was appointed to be the Inaugural Frank R. Mori Professor in the Arts & Sciences.  His research has centered on organometallic chemistry, with focus on the chemistry of transition metal complexes interacting with fluorocarbons and the organometallic chemistry of small organic rings.  After 35 years of experimental work, he transitioned to computational chemistry and collaborative research.

Honors 
Hughes is a Fellow of the Alfred P. Sloan Foundation, the American Chemical Society, the American Association for the Advancement of Science, the  Alexander von Humboldt Foundation, and the Royal Society of Chemistry. He was awarded a Doctor of Science degree for his independent published research work by the University of Manchester in 1990.  The American Chemical Society gave him its Award for Creative Work in Fluorine Chemistry in 2010.

In 2002, Hughes received the Dartmouth Student Assembly’s “Profile in Excellence” Teaching Award.  On his retirement from teaching in 2015, he was awarded the Elizabeth Howland Hand - Otis Norton Pierce Award.

Research highlights

Metal Complexes of Octafluorocyclooctatetraene (OFCOT) 
One of Hughes’ research interests focused on the study of transition metal complexes with octafluorocyclooctatetraene (OFCOT), and the comparison of the structural features of these complexes to the hydrocarbon counterpart of OFCOT cyclooctatetraene (COT).  One striking difference in the coordination complexes of OFCOT is that their thermal stability and resistance to undergo dynamic rearrangements in binding geometry (reduced fluxional character) are greatly enhanced compared to COT analogs.  These differences can be rationalized based on the relative thermodynamic stability of the isomers computed using density functional theory (DFT).

First Transition Metal Complexes Containing Perfluorocyclopentadienyl Ligand 
In 1992, Hughes and coworkers reported a creative use of flash vacuum pyrolysis (at 770 °C) to extrude CO from an oxacyclohexadienyl complex led to the first metallocene containing a perfluorinated cyclopentadienyl ring, η5-C5F5. Direct comparison of the ruthenocene to its perfluorocyclopentadienyl analog enabled direct insight into the structural similarities and differences of the two compounds. It was observed that the C5F5 interaction with Ru results in a shorter distance between this ring and Ru, compared to the hydrocarbon analog.

Perfluorobenzyne Complex 
In 2001, through dehydrofluorination of an iridium complex bearing perfluorophenyl and hydride groups, Hughes and coworkers synthesized to the first transition metal complex of perfluorobenzyne (C6F4).

Perfluorocarbene Complexes 
In 2005, through an inner-sphere reduction reaction of perfluoroalkyl ligands Hughes and coworkers provided a novel and useful route to difluorocarbene and perfluoroalkylidene complexes.  This was followed in 2007 by the synthesis of the first, and so far, the only, example of a carbene ligand bearing two strongly electron withdrawing perfluoroalkyl groups.

The Simplest Fluorocarbon as Ligand 
In 2006, Hughes and coworkers showed that even the simplest possible fluorocarbon fragment, CF, stabilized by a triple bond to molybdenum, could be prepared by reduction of a Mo-trifluoromethyl complex.

References 

1946 births
British chemists
Living people